Oselce is a municipality and village in Plzeň-South District in the Plzeň Region of the Czech Republic. It has about 300 inhabitants.

Administrative parts
Villages of Kotouň and Nová Ves are administrative parts of Oselce.

Geography
It lies in the Blatná Uplands. The territory is rich in ponds, the largest of them is Široký.

History
The first written mention of Oselce is from 1388. The Knights of Oselce owned the village from 1388 until the 16th century. A fortress in Oselce was first documented in the mid-16th century, but it was probably older. From 1673 to 1805, Oselce was property of the Janovský of Janovice family.

The next notable owners of Oselce was the Booss-Waldeck family, who held the castle from 1832 to 1945. Oselce had the greatest fame at the time of their possession by Viktor Booss-Waldeck in 1887–1916, who was a patron of art and music. At that time, many celebrities were frequent guests at the castle, including Jaroslav Vrchlický, Oskar Nedbal, Josef Suk, Josef Svatopluk Machar, Josef Václav Sládek, Václav Talich, Karel Matěj Čapek-Chod, and others.

Education
In Oselce there is a school that provides primary and secondary education. The secondary school offers  apprenticeships in blacksmithing, locksmithing, carpentry and vehicle and agricultural machinery repair.

Sights

The Oselce Castle was built in the early Baroque style in 1680. It was built on the site of a medieval fortress which was rennaisance rebuilt. In 1707–1737, the castle was rebuilt by Giacomo Antonio de Maggi, and the castle chapel was added. In the basement of the castle chapel, there is a ceiling fresco of St. John of Nepomuk and Czech patrons from the first half of the 18th century. The castle is surrounded by an English-style park. There is a large baroque one-story granary in the park. Today, the castle houses the school.

The parish Church of the Assumption of the Virgin Mary is the landmark of the village of Kotouň. It was built by G. A. de Maggi in 1703–1705. It replaced an old church from 1475, destroyed by fire. The church complex is also formed by adjacent cemetery with a Baroque bell tower from 1696. Near the church the is a valuable early Baroque building of the rectory, which dates from 1736.

On Markétin vrch there is the Chapel of Saint Margaret. This Baroque chapel dates from 1691.

References

External links

Villages in Plzeň-South District